William O. Bright (1928–2006), American linguist who specialized in Native American and South Asian languages

William Bright may also refer to:

 William Bright (historian) (1824–1901), English Church historian
 Bill Bright (1921–2003), American evangelist and founder of Campus Crusade for Christ
 William Leatham Bright (1851–1910), English Liberal politician
 William H. Bright Jr., judge of the Connecticut Appellate Court

See also
 Bright (disambiguation)